HMS Chester was a 50-gun fourth rate ship of the line of the Royal Navy, built at Deptford to the dimensions laid down in the 1741 proposals of the 1719 Establishment, and launched on 18 February 1743.

Chester was sold out of the navy in 1767.

Notes

References

Lavery, Brian (2003) The Ship of the Line - Volume 1: The development of the battlefleet 1650-1850. Conway Maritime Press. .

Ships of the line of the Royal Navy
1743 ships